Chiu Yuen Cemetery is a private cemetery located on Mount Davis, on Hong Kong Island, Hong Kong.

History 
The cemetery was established in 1897 under the initiative of Sir Robert Ho Tung and Ho Kam Tong. It was the only cemetery in Hong Kong created exclusively for members of the local Eurasian community.

A World War II pillbox is located within Chiu Yuen Cemetery.

Notable burials
 Clara Cheung Lin-kok (1875–1938), wife of Robert Hotung
 Victoria Lo, daughter of Robert Hotung
 Henry Hotung, son of Robert Hotung
 Daisy Hotung, daughter of Robert Hotung
 Edward Hotung, son of Robert Hotung
 Eva Hotung, daughter of Robert Hotung
 Robert Hotung, Ho Shai-lai, son of Robert Hotung
 Grace Lo, daughter of Robert Hotung
 Mary Wong, daughter of Robert Hotung
 George Ho, son of Robert Hotung
 Bobbie Kotewall (1916–1996) – Principal of SPCC (1952–1984), daughter of Robert Kotewall British Hong Kong civil servant and businessman.

See also
 List of cemeteries in Hong Kong

References

External links

 
 Gwulo: Old Hong Kong, Chiu Yuen Cemetery (Eurasian)
 Royal Asiatic Society Hong Kong Branch Newsletter: "Visit to Chiu Yuen Cemetery, Mount Davis", September 2006
 Royal Asiatic Society Hong Kong Branch Newsletter: "Visit to Chiu Yuen Cemetery, Pokfulam", January 2007

Cemeteries in Hong Kong
Mount Davis, Hong Kong